Specialty Records was an American record label founded in Los Angeles in 1945 by Art Rupe. It was known for rhythm and blues, gospel, and early rock and roll, and recorded artists such as Little Richard, Guitar Slim, Percy Mayfield, and Lloyd Price. Rupe established the company under the name Juke Box Records but changed it to Specialty in 1946 when he parted company with a couple of his original partners. Rupe's daughter, Beverly, restarted the label in the 1980s.

The major producers for the label were Rupe, Robert "Bumps" Blackwell, Johnny Vincent and J. W. Alexander.  Rupe was known for hating the practice of payola, but by 1953, "the only way for Specialty to remain competitive was to pay like everybody else."

Specialty owned music publishing companies: Venice Music for BMI-licensed songs, and Greenwich Music for ASCAP-licensed songs.

The record label was sold to Fantasy Records in 1991 and is now part of the Concord Music Group. The music publishing unit was sold to Sony/ATV Music Publishing.

Roster 
 The Blind Boys of Alabama
 Alex Bradford
 Wynona Carr
 Clifton Chenier
 Eugene Church
 Dorothy Love Coates
 Sam Cooke 
 John Lee Hooker
 Camille Howard
 Little Richard 
 Guitar Slim
 Roddy Jackson 
 Jimmy Liggins
 Joe Liggins
 Roy Milton
 Percy Mayfield
 Lloyd Price
 Frankie Lee Sims
 Soul Stirrers
 Larry Williams
 Lester Williams

See also
 List of record labels

References

External links
 Official website
 Specialty Records history
 Discography
 Specialty Records on the Internet Archive's Great 78 Project

Specialty Records artists with Wikipedia pages
Record labels established in 1946
Record labels disestablished in 1991
Rhythm and blues record labels
Blues record labels
Rock and roll record labels
Defunct record labels of the United States
Concord Music Group
1946 establishments in California